The Wekiva River (sometimes spelled Wekiwa, a Creek word meaning "spring of water") is a  river in Central Florida, north of Orlando in the United States.  It originates in Apopka and joins the St. Johns River, the longest river in the state, in DeBary.  The Wekiva River system includes the main stem joined by three main tributaries - Rock Springs Run, Blackwater Creek, and the Little Wekiva River - and about 30 contributing groundwater springs.   It is designated as a Florida State Canoe Trail, an Outstanding Florida Water, and an Aquatic Preserve by the Florida Department of Environmental Protection.  The Wekiva River system is also one of the two rivers in Florida federally designated as a National Wild and Scenic River for its scenery, recreation, geology, and diverse habitats.

Wekiwa is the Creek-Seminole word for a spring, but contrary to popular belief that Wekiva means "flowing water", it was actually an alternate spelling used by developers. The pronunciation of a soft-w, sometimes perceived as a v or b, resulted in cartographers mislabeling maps in later years. The maps drawn in 1838 and 1849 were spelled Wekiwa.

Overview 
The Wekiva River nearly follows the boundary between Orange and Seminole Counties. After Orange County, the river separates Lake County and Seminole County.

Origin 

The Florida Department of Environmental Protection defines the portion of the river from Wekiwa Springs to the confluence with Rock Springs Run as the Wekiwa Springs Run.  The Wekiva River then starts from the confluence of the two spring runs and joins the St. Johns River after . Other contributing springs are Sanlando Springs and Palm Springs.

Course

Wekiwa Springs 
The headwater of the Wekiva River is the Wekiwa Springs, a second-magnitude spring located within the Wekiwa Springs State Park in Apopka. The clear, bluish-green water narrows into a -wide run as it flows northeastward.

Rock Springs Run 
Rock Springs is situated inside Kelly Park, an Orange County park in Apopka. After leaving the county park, the stream enters the Wekiwa Springs State Park, meandering for a total length of  before joining Wekiva River. After the confluence, the area left of the Wekiva River is protected by Rock Springs Run State Reserve, another Florida state park.

Bridge to nowhere
The bridge is located at the end of Miami Springs Drive in Seminole County.

Sweetwater Creek 
The -long stream is merged by the outflow of Miami Springs, a third- magnitude spring, about  before the confluence with Wekiva River.

Wekiva River Buffer Conservation Area 
Beyond the creek, the eastern side of the river is protected by the Wekiva River Buffer Conservation Area, a  protected seasonal wetlands of lush floodplain forest of hardwoods, ferns, and sabal palms along the Wekiva and Little Wekiva Rivers.  Protecting the natural condition of the area helps preserve the water quality of both rivers.

Little Wekiva River 
The -long Little Wekiva River is the only tributary influenced by the areas north and west of urban Orlando. The St. Johns River Water Management District  has worked with the Florida Department of Environmental Protection, the Florida Department of Transportation, the city of Altamonte Springs, Seminole and Orange counties, environmental interest groups and basin residents to find solutions in rehabilitating and protecting the Little Wekiva to minimize its negative impact in the water quality of the Wekiva River. In Longwood before the Little Wekiva enters the Wekiva River Buffer Conservation Area, several second- and third-magnitude springs, including the Sanlando Springs, replenish the Little Wekiva with fresh underground water.

State Road 46 

Black Water Creek 
The last main tributary of the Wekiva River is the  Blackwater Creek, which joins the Wekiva about  before the Wekiva joins the St. Johns River.

See also 
List of Florida rivers

References

External links 
Map of Wekiva River Aquatic Preserve
 Wekiva River at PaddleFlorida.net

Rivers of Florida
Rivers of Lake County, Florida
Rivers of Orange County, Florida
Rivers of Seminole County, Florida
Outstanding Florida Waters
Tributaries of the St. Johns River
Wild and Scenic Rivers of the United States